A short-rate model, in the context of interest rate derivatives, is a mathematical model that describes the future evolution of interest rates by describing the future evolution of the short rate, usually written .

The short rate
Under a short rate model, the stochastic state variable is taken to be the instantaneous spot rate. The short rate, then, is the (continuously compounded, annualized) interest rate at which an entity can borrow money for an infinitesimally short period of time from time . Specifying the current short rate does not specify the entire yield curve.

where  is the natural filtration for the process. The interest rates implied by the zero coupon bonds form a yield curve, or more precisely, a zero curve. Thus, specifying a model for the short rate specifies future bond prices. This means that instantaneous forward rates are also specified by the usual formula

Particular short-rate models
Throughout this section  represents a standard Brownian motion under a risk-neutral probability measure and  its differential.

One-factor short-rate models
Following are the one-factor models, where a single stochastic factor – the short rate – determines the future evolution of all interest rates. 
Other than Rendleman–Bartter and Ho–Lee, which do not capture the mean reversion of interest rates, these models can be thought of as specific cases of Ornstein–Uhlenbeck processes. 
The Vasicek, Rendleman–Bartter and CIR models have only a finite number of free parameters and so it is not possible to specify these parameter values in such a way that the model coincides with observed market prices ("calibration"). This problem is overcome by allowing the parameters to vary deterministically with time. 
In this way, Ho-Lee and subsequent models can be calibrated to market data, meaning that these can exactly return the price of bonds comprising the yield curve. The implementation is usually via a (binomial) short rate tree  or simulation; see  and Monte Carlo methods for option pricing.

Merton's model (1973) explains the short rate as : where  is a one-dimensional Brownian motion under the spot martingale measure.
The Cox–Ingersoll–Ross model (1985) supposes , it is often written . The  factor precludes (generally) the possibility of negative interest rates.
The Hull–White model (1990)—also called the extended Vasicek model—posits . The model may also be applied as lognormal. Lattice-based implementation is usually trinomial.
 The Black–Derman–Toy model (1990) has  for time-dependent short rate volatility and  otherwise; the model is lognormal.
The Black–Karasinski model (1991), which is lognormal, has . The model may be seen as the lognormal application of Hull–White; its lattice-based implementation is similarly trinomial (binomial requiring varying time-steps).
This approach is effectively similar to “the original Salomon Brothers model" (1987), also a lognormal variant on Ho-Lee.

Multi-factor short-rate models
Besides the above one-factor models, there are also multi-factor models of the short rate, among them the best known are the Longstaff and Schwartz two factor model and the Chen three factor model (also called "stochastic mean and stochastic volatility model"). Note that for the purposes of risk management, "to create realistic interest rate simulations", these multi-factor short-rate models are sometimes preferred over One-factor models, as they produce scenarios which are, in general, better "consistent with actual yield curve movements".
 The Longstaff–Schwartz model (1992) supposes the short rate dynamics are given by

 
 where the short rate is defined as
 
 The Chen model (1996) which has a stochastic mean and volatility of the short rate, is given by

Other interest rate models
The other major framework for interest rate modelling is the Heath–Jarrow–Morton framework (HJM). Unlike the short rate models described above, this class of models is generally non-Markovian. This makes general HJM models computationally intractable for most purposes. The great advantage of HJM models is that they give an analytical description of the entire yield curve, rather than just the short rate. For some purposes (e.g., valuation of mortgage backed securities), this can be a big simplification. The Cox–Ingersoll–Ross and Hull–White models in one or more dimensions can both be straightforwardly expressed in the HJM framework. Other short rate models do not have any simple dual HJM representation.

The HJM framework with multiple sources of randomness, including as it does the Brace–Gatarek–Musiela model and market models, is often preferred for models of higher dimension.

Models based on Fischer Black's shadow rate are used when interest rates approach the zero lower bound.

See also
 Fixed-income attribution

References

Further reading
 

 

Andrew J.G. Cairns (2004). Interest-Rate Models; entry in 

 
 
 Lane Hughston (2003). The Past, Present and Future of Term Structure Modelling; entry in 
 

 
 
 
 

Interest rates

Mathematical finance